George Stacey "Trooper" Box (October 27, 1892 – December 26, 1962) was a Canadian professional ice hockey player. He played for the Victoria Aristocrats in the Pacific Coast Hockey Association during the 1915–16 and 1918–19 seasons. In between his stints with the Aristocrats Box saw military service in WW1, hence his nickname "Trooper".

Box also played for various teams in the Vancouver City Senior Hockey League (VCSHL) and in the Vancouver Commercial Hockey League.

References

1892 births
1962 deaths
Canadian ice hockey right wingers
Ice hockey people from Ontario
People from Renfrew County
Victoria Aristocrats players